Padmavati is an epic poem written in 1540AD by Alaol. It is a medieval Bengali poem inspired by the Awadhi poem Padmavat, by Malik Muhammad Jayasi. Blended with folklore and history, the poem is about the marriage of Ratnasimha and Sinhala and the ever-beautiful princess Padmavati of Chittor. However, Alauddin Khalji of the Delhi Sultanate leads an invasion to win her. The Bengali version of the account focuses more on the topic of secular love and less on Sufism, unlike the original. The poem was written under the patronage of Quraishi Magan Thakur. According to this text, Padmini (Padmavati) handed over the responsibility of her two sons to the Sultan, Alauddin before her death by committing jauhar.

Origin
According to Alaol, the people of Roshang wanted to hear the story of Padmavati, which was performed in the Chief Minister, Magan Thakur's assembly. Thakur then ordered Alaol to compose it in Bengali.

Legacy
It inspired a number of novels, plays and poems in 19th-century Bengali literature. It also had Bengali adaptations by Kshirode Prasad Vidyavinode in 1906 and Abanindranath Tagore in 1909.

References

Bengali-language literature
Bangladeshi poems
1648 books
Rohingya people
1648 poems
Epic poems
Bengali poetry